The women's K-4 500 metres event was a fours kayaking event conducted as part of the Canoeing at the 1988 Summer Olympics program.

Medalists

Results

Heats
13 crews entered in two heats on September 27. The top three finishers from each of the heats advanced directly to the finals while the remaining seven teams were relegated to the semifinal.

Semifinal
The top three finishers in the semifinal (raced on September 29) advanced to the final.

South Korea's intermediate time was not listed in the official report.

Final
A final was held on October 1.

References
1988 Summer Olympics official report Volume 2, Part 2. p. 350. 
Sports-reference.com women's 1988 K-4 500 m results.

Women's K-4 500
Olympic
Women's events at the 1988 Summer Olympics